Pension pro svobodné pány is a 1968 Czechoslovak comedy film directed by Jiří Krejčík. It is based on Seán O'Casey's  1951 short play Bedtime Story.

Plot
Visits by women are strictly prohibited at Miss Mossierová pension for bachelors. Nevertheless, some of the younger tenants cannot resist the temptation and sometimes try to sneak a young lady to their room. The landlady, however, stands guard all night. Bernard Mulligan manages to get his mistress, Andela, to his room and into his bed. But morning is coming and Halibut, Mulligan's roommate, is soon to return home from a party. Mulligan does his best to wake the girl up and get her out. The sleepy Andela, however, instantly grasps that all her lover's tenderness is gone, and begins to torture him maliciously.

Cast and characters
 Josef Abrhám as Mulligan
 Iva Janžurová as Anděla
 Jiří Hrzán as Halibut
 Věra Ferbasová as Miss Mossierová
 Pavel Landovský as tenant

References

External links
 

1968 films
Czechoslovak comedy films
1968 comedy films
Films based on works by Seán O'Casey
Czech comedy films
1960s Czech-language films
1960s Czech films